Meadow Grounds Lake was completed in 1965 and is a 204-acre reservoir located within State Game Lands 53 in Fulton County, Pennsylvania. The dam and lake areas are leased to the Pennsylvania Fish and Boat Commission (PFBC) by the Pennsylvania Game Commission. The dam was designed and built by the PFBC and construction of the dam was complete in June 1964. As the permit holder for the Meadow Grounds Dam the PFBC is responsible for its safe operation and maintenance. Meadow Grounds Dam is categorized by the Pennsylvania Department of Environmental Protection (PADEP) as a High Hazard (Category 1), size class B structure. The drainage area of the dam’s watershed is 3.2 square miles on Roaring Run. The zoned earth embankment creates a 204-acre reservoir and at normal pool stores 3130 (acre-feet) of water. A normal pool elevation of 1495.3’ is maintained throughout the year via the principal and auxiliary spillways. The zoned earth fill dam is 39 feet in height and 530 feet long. The auxiliary spillway at Meadow Grounds Dam is a trapezoidal-shaped concrete chute cut into rock though a natural saddle about 200 feet to the right of the dams right abutment. The spillway is provided with a 67 foot long trapezoidal-shaped weir that discharges into a concrete lined stilling basin and then into a riprap lined earth channel.

Update: The dam at the lake has been repaired and the lake is now once again full.  Fishing is now permitted, but only with catch and release. (Steve Maczuga, 8/25/2022)

References 
 Meadow Grounds Lake could be closed up to 4 years.
 PFBC Bureau of Engineering Dam Summary.
 Fulton County Commissioners 2nd Opinion Dam Summary Results.

External links 
Pennsylvania Fish & Boat Commission

Reservoirs in Pennsylvania
Dams in Pennsylvania
Dams completed in 1965
Bodies of water of Fulton County, Pennsylvania